Meidlinger is a surname. Notable people with the surname include:

Christian Meidlinger (born 1971), Austrian cyclist
Meggie Meidlinger, American baseball player

See also
Meilinger